Yusidey Silié Frómeta (born 11 November 1984 in Havana) is a Cuban volleyball player who competed in the 2008 Summer Olympics finishing fourth with the Cuban team in the Olympic tournament.

Career
Silié has been playing with the Cuban club Ciudad de La Habana since 2005. In the 2006 season, she won the Best Spiker and Best Blocker while her team won the League Championship.

For the 2010 season she became with her team league champion (Liga Nacional), and individually awarded "Best Setter" and "Most Valuable Player".

She won the "Best Setter" award for the 2011 season of the Cuban Liga Nacional, playing with the crowned champions Ciudad Habana from the Cuban capital city.

Yusidey won with his national team the silver medal at the 2011 Pan American Games held in Guadalajara, Mexico.

Clubs
  Ciudad de La Habana (2005–2011)

Awards

Individual
 2006 Cuban Liga Nacional "Best Spiker"
 2006 Cuban Liga Nacional "Best Blocker"
 2010 Cuban Liga Nacional "Most Valuable Player"
 2010 Cuban Liga Nacional "Best Setter"
 2011 Cuban Liga Nacional "Best Setter"

Club
 2005 Cuban Liga Nacional -  Champion, with Ciudad de La Habana
 2006 Cuban Liga Nacional -  Champion, with Ciudad de La Habana
 2010 Cuban Liga Nacional -  Champion, with Ciudad de La Habana
 2011 Cuban Liga Nacional -  Champion, with Ciudad de La Habana

National team

Senior team
 2007 Montreux Volley Masters -  Silver medal
 2007 Pan American Games -  Gold medal
 2007 NORCECA Championship -  Gold medal
 2008 FIVB World Grand Prix -  Silver medal
 2008 Montreux Volley Masters -  Gold medal
 2010 Montreux Volley Masters -  Bronze medal
 2011 Pan American Games -  Silver medal

References

External links
 FIVB Profile
 

1984 births
Living people
Cuban women's volleyball players
Olympic volleyball players of Cuba
Volleyball players at the 2008 Summer Olympics
Volleyball players at the 2011 Pan American Games
Pan American Games silver medalists for Cuba
Pan American Games gold medalists for Cuba
Pan American Games medalists in volleyball
Opposite hitters
Setters (volleyball)
Medalists at the 2011 Pan American Games